Chief Dan George  (born Geswanouth Slahoot; July 24, 1899 – September 23, 1981) was a chief of the Tsleil-Waututh Nation, a Coast Salish band whose Indian reserve is located on Burrard Inlet in the southeast area of the District of North Vancouver, British Columbia, Canada. He also was an actor, musician, poet and an author. The Chief's best-known written work is "My Heart Soars". As an actor, he is best remembered for portraying Old Lodge Skins opposite Dustin Hoffman in Little Big Man (1970), for which he was nominated for the Academy Award for Best Supporting Actor, and for his role in The Outlaw Josey Wales (1976), as Lone Watie, opposite Clint Eastwood.

Early years
Born as Geswanouth Slahoot in North Vancouver, his English name was originally Dan Slaholt. The surname was changed to George when he entered a residential school at age 5. He worked at a number of different jobs, including as a longshoreman, construction worker, and school bus driver, and was band chief of the Tsleil-Waututh Nation from 1951 to 1963 (then called the Burrard Indian Band).

Acting career

1960–1970: Early roles and breakthrough 
In 1960, when he was already 60 years old, he landed his first acting job in a CBC Television series, Cariboo Country, as the character Ol' Antoine (pron. "Antwine"). He performed the same role in a Walt Disney Studios film Smith! (1969), adapted from an episode in the series The High Chaparral (the episode in turn being based on Breaking Smith's Quarter Horse, a novella by Paul St. Pierre). At age 71, he received several honors for his role in the film Little Big Man (1970), including a nomination for the Academy Award for Best Supporting Actor.

1971–1981: Subsequent success 
In 1971 He played Chief Red Cloud in Season 13 Episode 14 (Warbonnet) on the Western series Bonanza.
He played the role of Rita Joe's father in George Ryga's stage play, The Ecstasy of Rita Joe, in performances at Vancouver, the National Arts Centre in Ottawa, and Washington, D.C.

In 1972, he was among the guests in the television special The Special London Bridge Special. That same year he acted in the film Cancel My Reservation, and got the recurring role of Chief Moses Charlie in the comedy-drama television series The Beachcombers, a role he would revisit until his death in 1981.

In 1973, he played the role of "Ancient Warrior" in an episode of the TV show Kung Fu. That same year George recorded "My Blue Heaven" with the band Fireweed, with "Indian Prayer" on the reverse. His album, Chief Dan George & Fireweed – In Circle, was released in 1974 comprising these songs and seven others.

The following year he had roles in Alien Thunder (1974), The Bears and I (1974), and Harry and Tonto (1974). 

In 1975, he portrayed the character Chief Stillwater in the "Showdown at Times Square" episode in Season 6 of McCloud.

In 1976 he was hired to act in The Outlaw Josey Wales, and Shadow of the Hawk.

On television the following year he had role in the 1978 miniseries Centennial, based on the book by James A. Michener.

In 1979, he acted in Americathon and Spirit of the Wind.

In 1980 he had his final film role in Nothing Personal.

1984: Posthumous written work 
George was well known for his poetic writing style and in 1974, George wrote My Heart Soars followed by My Spirit Soars in 1983, both published by Hancock House Publishers. The two books were later combined to form The Best of Chief Dan George which went on to become a best seller and continues to sell well today. One of his better known pieces of poetry A Lament for Confederation has become one of his most widely known works.

Death 
The Chief died at the Lion's Gate Hospital in North Vancouver in 1981 at the age of 82. He was interred at Burrard Cemetery.

Personal life
Dan George's granddaughter Lee Maracle was a poet, author, activist, and professor. His granddaughter Charlene Aleck is an actress who performed for 18 years on The Beachcombers on CBC. His
great-granddaughter Columpa Bobb is an actress and poet.

Chief Dan George's grand-nephew, Chief Jesse "Nighthawk" George, currently resides in Chesapeake, Virginia, and is the Inter-Tribal Peace Chief for the Commonwealth of Virginia.

Activism 
During his acting career, he worked to promote better understanding by non-aboriginals of the First Nations people. His soliloquy, Lament for Confederation, an indictment of the appropriation of native territory by European colonialism, was performed at the City of Vancouver's celebration of the Canadian centennial in 1967. This speech is credited with escalating native political activism in Canada and touching off widespread pro-native sentiment among non-natives.

Accolades
Chief Dan George received the following accolades for Little Big Man (film).

Honors and legacy

In 1971, George was made an Officer of the Order of Canada.

He was included on the Golden Rule Poster under "Native Spirituality" with the quote: "We are as much alive as we keep the earth alive".

Canadian actor Donald Sutherland narrated the following quote from his poem "My Heart Soars" in the opening ceremonies of the 2010 Winter Olympics in Vancouver.

The beauty of the trees,
the softness of the air,
the fragrance of the grass,
speaks to me.
And my heart soars.

Legacy
 Chief Dan George Middle School in Abbotsford, British Columbia
 Chief Dan George Public School in Toronto, Ontario
 Chief Dan George Theatre, Phoenix Theatre, University of Victoria, British Columbia

In 2008 Canada Post issued a postage stamp in its "Canadians in Hollywood" series featuring Chief Dan George.

Filmography

Written works
 George, Dan, and Helmut Hirnschall. My Heart Soars. Toronto: Clarke, Irwin, 1974. 
 George, Dan, and Helmut Hirnschall. My Spirit Soars. Surrey, B.C., Canada: Hancock House, 1982. 
 Mortimer, Hilda, and Dan George. You Call Me Chief: Impressions of the Life of Chief Dan George. Toronto: Doubleday Canada, 1981. 
 George, Dan, and Helmut Hirnschall. The Best of Chief Dan George. Surrey, B.C.: Hancock House, 2003.

See also

 Dark Cloud
 Chief Thundercloud
 Iron Eyes Cody
 History of Squamish and Tsleil-Waututh longshoremen, 1863–1963
 Indigenous Canadian personalities
 Indigenous peoples of the Pacific Northwest Coast

References

External links
 
 Chief Dan George on CBC TV's Telescope, 1971
 

1899 births
1981 deaths
20th-century Canadian male actors
20th-century Canadian poets
20th-century First Nations writers
Articles containing video clips
Canadian male film actors
Canadian male poets
Canadian male television actors
First Nations male actors
First Nations poets
Indigenous leaders in British Columbia
Industrial Workers of the World members
Male Western (genre) film actors
Male actors from Vancouver
Officers of the Order of Canada
People from North Vancouver
Tsleil-Waututh First Nation